Nanoplagia is a genus of parasitic flies in the family Tachinidae.

Species
Nanoplagia hilfii (Strobl, 1902)
Nanoplagia sinaica (Villeneuve, 1909)

References

Diptera of Europe
Diptera of Asia
Diptera of Africa
Dexiinae
Tachinidae genera
Taxa named by Joseph Villeneuve de Janti